The 1937 Norwegian Football Cup was the 36th season of the Norwegian annual knockout football tournament. The tournament was open for all members of NFF, except those from Northern Norway. The final was played at Urædd Stadion in Porsgrunn on 17 October 1937, and was contested by the previous year's losing finalist Mjøndalen and the eleven–time former winners Odd. Mjøndalen secured their third title with a 4–2 win in the final. Fredrikstad were the defending champions, but were eliminated by Mjøndalen in the semifinal.

Rounds and dates
 First round: 6 June
 Second round: 20 June
 Third round: 27 June
 Fourth round: 15 August
 Quarter-finals: 29 August
 Semi-finals: 26 September
 Final: 17 October

First round

|-
|colspan="3" style="background-color:#97DEFF"|Replay

|}

Second round

{{OneLegResult|Vard||0–0 |Hardy'}}

|-
|colspan="3" style="background-color:#97DEFF"|Replay|}

Third round

|-
|colspan="3" style="background-color:#97DEFF"|Replay|}

Fourth round

|-
|colspan="3" style="background-color:#97DEFF"|Replay''

|}

Quarter-finals

|}

Semi-finals

|}

Final

See also
1937 in Norwegian football

References

Norwegian Football Cup seasons
Norway
Cup